Ruoqiang Town (Uyghur: Чакилик: Qakilik or Charkliq) is a town in Ruoqiang County, Bayin'gholin Mongol Autonomous Prefecture in southeastern Xinjiang, People's Republic of China. Ruoqiang Town is the county seat of the Ruoqiang County, and therefore is the place that less detailed maps label as "Ruoqiang County" or just "Ruoqiang". The postal code is 841 800.

There is no motorable road east to Dunhuang in Gansu, but one can now drive southeast through the Altun Shan range and then north through part of the Tsaidam to Dunhuang.

Names
Lionel Giles has recorded the following names for Ruoqiang Town (with his Wade-Giles forms of the Chinese names converted to pinyin):

"Yixun, or Yixiu, capital of Shanshan after 77 B.C. (Note: This is an incorrect identification, the capital's name was, in fact, Yüni 扜泥.)
Shanshan Zhen [Sui].
Nafubo (纳缚波) [Xuanzang].
Dianhe [Tang].
Shicheng Zhen [Tang after A.D. 675].
Great Nob [Tibetan records].
City of Lop [Marco Polo]
Charkhlik [modern name]."

History

During the latter part of the Former Han and throughout the Later Han the capital of the kingdom of Shanshan was known as Yüni 扜泥, which was located near the present town of Ruoqiang.

Ruoqiang Town was established in 1984.

In 2014, Xincheng and Loulan were established as residential communities.

Geography

Almost adjacent to the town are the Tieganlike Town, to the east, and Wutamu Township, to the west. They, however, are not administratively part of Ruoqiang Town, but are separate township-level administrative units.

Ruoqiang Town  was used by numerous notable explorers as a launching point to the Lop Nor archaeological sites, which are located within  to the northeast.

Climate
Ruoqiang has a cold desert climate (Köppen climate classification BWk) with extreme seasonal variation in temperature. Precipitation totals only  annually, and mostly falls in summer. No month has less than 60% of possible sunshine, and the area receives close to 3,100 hours of bright sunshine annually.

Administrative divisions

As of 2018, the town was made up of five residential communities:

Residential Communities
 Shengli, Wenhua, Tuanjie, Xincheng, Loulan

Transportation
The town is the junction of China National Highway 315 and China National Highway 218, and is the southern terminus of the latter.

References

Further reading
Giles, Lionel (1930–1932). "A Chinese Geographical Text of the Ninth Century." BSOS VI, pp. 825–846.
 Paula, Christa (1994): The Road to Miran: Travels in the Forbidden Zone of Xinjiang. HarperCollins, Great Britain. Flamingo edition 1995.

External links
 A Tourism Guide to "Charklik / Ruoqiang - Ancient Kingdom and Outpost Gateway"

County seats in Xinjiang
Populated places in Xinjiang
Charklik
Township-level divisions of Xinjiang